Ilke Arslan is a Turkish American microscopist who is Director of the Center for Nanoscale Materials and the Nanoscience and Technology division at Argonne National Laboratory. She was awarded the Presidential Early Career Award for Scientists and Engineers in 2010 and appointed to the Oppenheimer Science and Energy Leadership Program in 2020.

Early life and education 
Arslanis is the daughter of diplomats. She grew up travelling between Turkey, New York City, Chicago and Vietnam. She was an undergraduate student at the University of Illinois Chicago, initially on a pre-med track. She could not handle dissections, so instead switched to physics, with a minor in Spanish. She spent several years of her undergraduate study studying in Spain. Arslan holds a doctorate in physics from the University of California, Davis. She worked as a postdoctoral researcher at the University of Cambridge. Arslan was supported by the Royal Society and the National Science Foundation. She eventually moved to the Sandia National Laboratories, where she worked as a Truman Fellow. Her work considered nano materials for energy and hydrogen storage. She worked on electron tomography, which she believed could help elucidate structure-property-activity relationships.

Research and career 
In 2008, Arslan joined the faculty at the University of California, Davis. After meeting Barack Obama at the ceremony for the Presidential Early Career Award for Scientists and Engineers in 2010, she became increasingly interested in science policy. She was appointed a senior scientist at the Pacific Northwest National Laboratory in 2011, where she investigated the morphological changes that occur when zeolites are used in Fischer–Tropsch processes. In particular, she explored how the distribution of cobalt changes as materials are reduced. She showed that some cobalt can move several nanometers onto the outside of the alumina support.

In 2017, Arslan joined the Argonne National Laboratory. Her first job involved working as a group leader in electron microscopy, with a particular focus on 3D in situ imaging. She was made Director of the Center for Nanoscale Materials.

Awards and honors 
 2010 Presidential Early Career Award for Scientists and Engineers
 2018 National Academy of Sciences Kavli Fellowship
 2018 Strategic Laboratory Leadership Program
 2019 Oppenheimer Science and Energy Leadership Program

Selected publications

References 

Living people
University of California, Davis alumni
University of Illinois Chicago alumni
Argonne National Laboratory people
American academics of Turkish descent
Sandia National Laboratories people
Microscopists
University of California, Davis faculty
21st-century American scientists
21st-century American women scientists
Year of birth missing (living people)